Aleardi is a surname. Notable people with the surname include:

Aleardo Aleardi (1812–1878), Italian poet
Pasquale Aleardi (born 1971), Swiss actor